Metal Church is the debut album by American heavy metal band Metal Church. The album was originally released by the independent record label Ground Zero in 1984. Based on the success of the album, the band was signed to a recording contract by Elektra Records, who reissued it in 1985. The cover art depicts a cruciform Gibson Explorer hidden in shadows and smoke.

The album contains a cover of Deep Purple's "Highway Star". The cassette edition and first European vinyl edition contained the bonus track "Big Guns". The Metal Blade Records compilation Metal Massacre V of 1984 features the song "The Brave", which is not included in this album. The first press release included a coupon to order a t-shirt and other merchandise.

Track listing

Personnel
Credits adapted from the album's liner notes.
Metal Church
David Wayne – vocals
Craig Wells – lead guitar
Kurdt Vanderhoof – rhythm guitar
Duke Erickson – bass
Kirk Arrington – drums

Production
Terry Date – producer, engineer
Jack Skinner – mastering
Saulius Pempe – photography
Willie Mackay – executive producer
Kurdt Vanderhoof – logo design
Ground Zero Entertainment - management

References

External links
Review of Metal Church at Play It Loud!

1984 debut albums
Metal Church albums
Albums produced by Terry Date
SPV/Steamhammer albums